Pokémon Diamond and Pearl Adventure! (sometimes abbreviated as DPA) is a Pokémon manga based on Pokémon Diamond, Pearl, and Platinum. The series is written and illustrated by Shigekatsu Ihara and published by Shogakukan. All eight volumes have been translated into English, and released in North America by Viz Media. Viz Media's translation was licensed by Singapore publisher Chuang Yi, who have released all eight volumes as well, with the first volume of Chuang Yi's version being released two years after Viz Media's version.

Story 
A young boy, Hareta, and his friends are trying to find Dialga. Hareta was allowed to live in the woods with Pokémon, which helps him bond with newly captured Pokémon. In book one, Hareta meets Mitsumi, Professor Rowan's helper, and a boy named Jun. Professor Rowan gives Hareta his first Pokémon, a Piplup. In this book, Hareta wins the Coal Badge and meets Team Galactic for the first time. He bites one of Team Galactic's Members as well. Hareta also catches a Shinx. In book two, Hareta enters his first contest. Later, Mitsumi enters and nearly wins. Hareta then meets Team Galactic again in Celestic Town. Hareta picks a fight with Cyrus, and Cyrus tries to get Hareta to join him. After losing to Cyrus, Hareta lays afloat, only to be rescued by Byron. Hareta challenges Byron and loses. Hareta is then instructed to go to Iron Island to train. There, Hareta meets Riley who gives him an egg. Riley and Hareta then have to beat Team Galactic yet again and Hareta's egg hatches in Riolu. Hareta trains for a month then comes out with an Onix, a Geodude, and a Zubat. Book three contains a large fight between Team Galactic and Hareta over the Legendary Azelf. Hareta once again, with help from all the Gym leaders, defeats Team Galactic. He wins by having Azelf power him with willpower.
In book four, Hareta meets gym leader Candice. Hareta wins the battle and capture the legendary Pokémon Regigigas. Then Byron, Hareta, and other gym leaders try to attack Galactic headquarters, but all except Bryon and Hareta went in to jail. Hareta realized that his best friend Mitsumi joined team Galactic. Hareta fights her and the end of the battle continues in book five. in the end Hareta defeats Mitsumi and goes on to face Cyrus but at that time Cyrus has collected all three legendary Pokémon and is starting to make the red chain the only object to call Dialga and control him.

Characters 

 Hareta (Japanese: ハレタ), the main character and the adopted grandson of Professor Rowan. He lived most of his life in the forest with wild Pokémon, practically thinking himself as one. His clothes indicate that he is based on Lucas; however, his hairstyle is vastly different and his vest lacks the white stripe that appears on that of Lucas. Deciding it would help the boy to travel and see the world, the Professor decided he should be a Pokémon Trainer and travel with his assistant, Mitsumi, and one of his Pokémon, Piplup.
 Mitsumi (Japanese: ミツミ) is a main character and the assistant of Professor Rowan. Her clothing implies that she is based on Dawn, albeit with a clearly distinctive hairstyle. An orphan, she was raised by Team Galactic. She became extremely close to Pokemon, and easy to manipulate. On a mission to destroy Professor Rowan's lab, Rowan convinced her that Pokémon are more than just tools, and she defected from Team Galactic, becoming Rowan's assistant. Later, she came along with Hareta to find Dialga. After she went to Lake Acuity, Cyrus managed to capture Mitsumi's Eevee. With Cyrus threatening to kill Eevee if she disobeyed him, Mitsumi was forced to rejoin Team Galactic and fought Hareta. After losing, she quit Team Galactic again, causing Jupiter to explode the room she was in with Light Screen.
 Jun (Japanese: ジュン) is based on Barry, but is more of Hareta's friend as pokémon friends to care for him. 
 Koya (Japanese: コウヤ)
 Professor Rowan (Japanese: ナナカマド博士 Dr. Nanakamado)
 "Looker" (Japanese: ハンサム "Handsome")
 Kaisei (Japanese: カイセー Kaise)
 Palmer (Japanese: クロツグ Kurotsugu)
 Riley (Japanese: ゲン Gen)

Pokémon League

Gym leaders 
 Roark (Japanese: ヒョウタ Hyota)
 Gardenia (Japanese: ナタネ Natane)
 Maylene (Japanese: スモモ Sumomo)
 Crasher Wake (Japanese: マキシマム仮面 Maximum Mask)
 Fantina (Japanese: メリッサ Melissa)
 Byron (Japanese: トウガン Tougan) finds Hareta washed up on the shore after having been defeated by Cyrus. Byron takes Hareta in and allows him to regain his strength before putting him through a rigorous training session similar to what he put Roark through years ago.
 Candice (Japanese: スズナ Suzuna)
 Volkner (Japanese: デンジ Volkner)

Elite Four and Champion 
 Aaron (Japanese: リョウ Ryo)
 Bertha (Japanese: キクノ Kikuno)
 Flint (Japanese: オーバ Oba)
 Lucian (Japanese: ゴヨウ Goyo)
 Cynthia (Japanese: シロナ Shirona)

Team Galactic 
 Cyrus (Japanese: アカギ Akagi) is Team Galactic's leader.
 Mars (Japanese: マーズ Mazu) is
 Jupiter (Japanese: ジュピター Jupita)
 Saturn (Japanese: サターン Satan)
 Charon (Japanese: プルート Pluto)
 B-2 (Japanese: Ｋ－２ K-2)

Pokémon species 
 Piplup (Japanese: ポッチャマ Pochama), Hareta's starter Pokémon, but after a while Hareta and Piplup's friendship becomes stronger, helping them win battles.
 Regigigas (Japanese: レジギガス Rejigigasu)
 Mesprit (Japanese: エムリット Emrit)
 Uxie (Japanese: ユクシー Yukushii)
 Azelf (Japanese: アグノム Agunomu)
 Dialga (Japanese: ディアルガ Diaruga)
 Palkia (Japanese: パルキア Parukia)
 Giratina (Japanese: ギラティナ)
 Heatran (Japanese: ヒードラン)

List of Chapters

See also 

 Pokémon (manga)

References

External links
 Pokémon Diamond and Pearl Adventure! on Bulbapedia

Pokémon manga
Shogakukan manga
Shōnen manga
Viz Media manga